Lemuel Theophilus Jones Jr. (March 15, 1924 – December 17, 1995) was an American politician in the state of Missouri. He served in the Missouri State Senate as a Republican from 1965 to 1975.

Early life
Lemuel Theophilus Jones Jr. was born on March 15, 1924, to Lemuel and Jessie Jones in Chicago, Illinois. They moved to Kansas City, Missouri in his childhood, where Jones attended local schools, including Southwest High School, Kansas City Junior College, and the University of Kansas. After graduating, Jones was commissioned as an officer in the United States Navy, where he served as a pilot during World War II, reaching the rank of Lieutenant Commander.

After the war, he attended the University of Iowa, studying for his LLB. There, he married Laverne Boes, and the two would go on to have two children, David and Marcia. He then moved back to Kansas City and started a law practice, where he entered local politics with the Republican Party.

Political career
Jones' first foray into politics was when he ran for U.S. Congress in 1956 from Missouri's 5th congressional district, but he lost the election to Richard W. Bolling. Despite his loss, he persisted in local politics, serving on the Jackson County Republican Committee from 1962 to 1964 and the St. Louis 9th Ward Republican Committee from 1962 to 1966. He then was elected to the State Senate in a special election taking place in the 10th district. He was re-elected in 1966 and 1970 but lost his bid for a third term to Democrat Harry Wiggins in 1974.

In 1968, Jones ran for Lieutenant Governor of Missouri, winning the Republican primary with 55 percent of the vote. However, he lost the general election to Democrat William S. Morris.

Later life
After leaving office, Jones returned to private life. He was as a trustee of Research Medical Center from 1957 to 1991 and a Chairman of the Board of the Research Medical Center College of Nursing until his retirement in 1994. He was also a founder and Chairman of the Board of CGI Long Distance Company, headquartered in Mission, Kansas. He died on December 17, 1995, at age 71. He was interred at Mount Moriah Cemetery in Kasnas City, Missouri.

Electoral history

|+ Missouri's 5th congressional district: 1956 Republican primary
! Year
!
! Subject
! Votes
! %
!
! Opponent
! Votes
! %
!
! Opponent
! Votes
! %
|-
|1956
||
| |Lem T. Jones
| |7,605 
| |72.71
||
| |Kenneth Dickey
| |1,983 
| |57.22
||
| |Elizabeth B. Caulk
| |872
| |8.34

|+ Missouri's 5th congressional district: Results 1956
! Year
!
! Subject
! Party
! Votes
! %
!
! Opponent
! Party
! Votes
! %
|-
|1956
||
| |Lem T. Jones
| |Republican
| |57,778
| |42.78
||
| |Richard W. Bolling (inc.)
| |Democratic
| |77,287
| |57.22

|+ Missouri's 10th State Senate district: August 1965 special election
! Year
!
! Subject
! Party
! Votes
! %
!
! Opponent
! Party
! Votes
! %
|-
|1965
||
| |Lem T. Jones
| |Republican
| |9,895
| |59.27
||
| |John P. Ryan
| |Democratic
| |6,800
| |40.73

|+ Missouri's 10th State Senate district: Results 1966-1974
! Year
!
! Subject
! Party
! Votes
! %
!
! Opponent
! Party
! Votes
! %
|-
|1966
||
| |Lem T. Jones
| |Republican
| |18,271
| |53.02
||
| |John A. Biersmith
| |Democratic
| |16,189
| |46.98
|-
|1970
||
| |Lem T. Jones (inc.)
| |Republican
| |22,004
| |55.12
|
| |Reynolds D. Rodgers
| |Democratic
| |17,918
| |44.88
|-
|1974
||
| |Lem T. Jones (inc.)
| |Republican
| |14,967
| |40.56
|
| |Harry Wiggins
| |Democratic
| |21,931
| |59.44

|+ Missouri Lieutenant Governor: 1968 Republican primary
! Year
!
! Subject
! Votes
! %
!
! Opponent
! Votes
! %
!
! Opponent
! Votes
! %
|-
|1968
||
| |Lem T. Jones
| |115,179
| |55.91
||
| |George R. Hart
| |69,978
| |33.97
||
| |James Pirtle
| |20,858
| |10.13

|+ Missouri Lieutenant Governor: Results 1968
! Year
!
! Subject
! Party
! Votes
! %
!
! Opponent
! Party
! Votes
! %
|-
|1968
||
| |Lem T. Jones
| |Republican
| |733,850
| |43.03
||
| |William S. Morris
| |Democratic
| |971,684
| |56.97

References

Republican Party Missouri state senators
1924 births
1995 deaths
20th-century American politicians